Sureshot or Sure Shot may refer to:

Music 
 "Sure Shot", a Beastie Boys song
 Sureshot (band), an American pop music group
 Sure Shot (rapper/producer), stage name of British hip hop musician Mark Duffus (of Blak Prophetz)
 "Sure Shot", a 1980 song by Crown Heights Affair
 "Sure Shot", a 1993 song by Polvo
 "Sure Shot", a 1981 song by Tracy Weber
 "Sureshot", a 2001 song by Yellowcard from One for the Kids
 "Sure Shot", a 2022 song by Koda Kumi

Other uses 
 nickname of Fred Dunlap (1859-1902), American Major League Baseball player and manager
 nickname of Stella Dickson (1922-1995), American Depression-era bank robber with her husband Bennie
 American nickname of the Canon AF35M 35mm camera
 Sureshot (Transformers), a fictional character in the Transformers universe
 Mission Man Band, also known as Sureshot, a 2007 American reality TV series, also the name of the newly formed band that is the focus of the series
 Sureshot (film), a 1996 American film starring Danny Hoch and Mekhi Phifer

See also 
 Annie Oakley (1860-1926), American sharpshooter and exhibition shooter nicknamed "Little Sure Shot" and "Little Miss Sure Shot"
 Manuel Marulanda, a Colombian guerrilla commander nicknamed Tirofijo, Spanish for "Sureshot"